Asiyan may refer to:
 Aşiyan, a neighborhood of Istanbul
 Asyan, a village in Iran